"Saturday Superhouse" is a song by Biffy Clyro and the first physical single from their fourth album, Puzzle. It was released on 5 March 2007. The band undertook a promotional tour of UK HMV stores to coincide with the release of the single.

Overview
Simon Neil has commented on the song, saying:{{cquote|This is a straight up pop-rock song. It felt great from the first time we played it together. It's about not knowing if you're making the right choices in life. Life is happening right now and if you're not careful you could wish it away.<ref>'Kerrang! Issue #1147, p.6</ref>}}

The song was first played live on 6 December 2006 at a warm-up concert at The Ice Factory nightclub in Perth, Scotland and first aired on radio on The Rock Show'' on BBC Radio 1, on 9 January 2007. B-sides "Scared of Lots of Everything" and "I'm Behind You" were first performed live on 16 December 2005 on the last night of Biffy's four night run at Glasgow's King Tut's Wah Wah Hut, a gig which showcased material that Biffy had written and recorded for the fourth album that at the time was due for release in the summer of 2006. The single was B-listed on the BBC Radio 1 playlist. The song reached number nine in the UK mid-week chart, and number 13 on the UK Singles Chart, becoming Biffy Clyro's highest charting single at the time. It also reached number one on the Scottish Singles Chart, the band's first of four singles to do so (see Scottish Singles and Albums Chart). All three b-sides were recorded by DP Johnson and mixed by Mark Williams.

Cover art
Storm Thorgerson has commented on the cover art of "Saturday Superhouse", saying:

Track listings
Songs and lyrics by Simon Neil. Music by Biffy Clyro.
 CD 14FLR19CD
 "Saturday Superhouse" – 3:19
 "Scared Of Lots Of Everything" – 3:54
 7" Vinyl #1 14FLR19V1
 "Saturday Superhouse" – 3:19
 "I'm Behind You" – 2:36
 7" Vinyl #2 14FLR19V2
 "Saturday Superhouse" – 3:19
 "Miracle Of Survival" – 4:53
 Digital Download "Saturday Superhouse" – 3:19
 iTunes Exclusive "Saturday Superhouse (Acoustic)"

 7digital Download Exclusive - Saturday Superhouse (Live)'''
 "Saturday Superhouse (Live at Belfast Mandela Hall)"
 "Saturday Superhouse (Live at Dublin Ambassador)"
 "Saturday Superhouse (Live at Cardiff University)"
 "Saturday Superhouse (Live at Bristol Academy)"
 "Saturday Superhouse (Live at Nottingham Rock City)"
 "Saturday Superhouse (Live at Southampton Guildhall)"
 "Saturday Superhouse (Live at Norwich UEA)"
 "Saturday Superhouse (Live at Manchester Academy)"
 "Saturday Superhouse (Live at Newcastle Academy)"
 "Saturday Superhouse (Live at Glasgow Barrowlands)"
 "Saturday Superhouse (Live at Liverpool Academy)"
 "Saturday Superhouse (Live at Birmingham Academy)"
 "Saturday Superhouse (Live at London Astoria)"

Personnel
 Simon Neil – Guitar, Vocals
 James Johnston – Bass, Vocals
 Ben Johnston – Drums, Vocals
 Garth Richardson – Producer

Charts

References

External links
 "Saturday Superhouse" on Last.fm
 "Saturday Superhouse" Lyrics
 "Saturday Superhouse" Guitar Tablature

Biffy Clyro songs
Albums with cover art by Storm Thorgerson
Songs written by Simon Neil
Song recordings produced by Garth Richardson
2007 singles
2007 songs
14th Floor Records singles
Number-one singles in Scotland